Curculio sulcatulus is a species of snout or bark beetle in the family Curculionidae. It is found in North America.

References

Further reading

External links

 

Curculioninae
Beetles described in 1897